Jackson Obede Morgan (born 18 August 1998) is a South Sudanese professional footballer who plays as a central midfielder for Iranian club Shahr Khodro and the South Sudan national team.

References

1998 births
Living people
People from Khartoum
People with acquired South Sudanese citizenship
South Sudanese footballers
Association football midfielders
South Sudan international footballers
Sudanese emigrants to Australia
Naturalised citizens of Australia
Australian soccer players
Australian people of South Sudanese descent
Sportspeople of South Sudanese descent
Perth Glory FC players
National Premier Leagues players